Ahmed Alsoudani was born in 1975 in Baghdad, Iraq and came to the United States after fleeing from his native country in the mid-1990s. He is best known for his vividly colored and surreal acrylic and charcoal canvases, in which distorted, grotesque faces and body parts portray the horrors of war. This motif draws on his own experiences of devastation and violence, evoking a universal experience of conflict and human suffering.

Alsoudani received his MFA in Painting from Yale School of Art in 2008, and also holds a BFA from Maine College of Art. His work was exhibited in the Iraq Pavilion at the 54th Venice Biennale in 2011. In 2012, Alsoudani received his first major institutional exhibition at the Wadsworth Atheneum Museum of Art, and in 2013, the Phoenix Museum of Art and the Portland Museum of Art presented Ahmed Alsoudani: Redacted, accompanied by a fully illustrated catalogue. Recent institutional group exhibitions include Chaos and Awe: Painting for the 21st Century, at the Frist Art Museum and the Chrysler Museum of Art in 2018-2019 and Artists in Exile: Expressions of Loss and Hope at the Yale University Art Gallery in 2017. Forthcoming exhibitions include Bitter Fruit at the Fabric Workshop and Museum, Philadelphia, Pennsylvania and In Between at Palazzo Cipolla, Rome, Italy (both 2021). In 2009, Hatje Cantz Verlag published the artist's first monograph.

Alsoudani's work is included in collections including Virginia Museum of Fine Arts, Wadsworth Atheneum Museum of Art, Phoenix Museum of Art, Portland Museum of Art, Columbus Museum of Art, and the Pinault Foundation, Paris. The artist lives and works in New York, New York.

References 

"Ahmed Alsoudani". Barjeel Art Foundation, Sharjah, United Arab Emirates. Retrieved 22 January 2021.
"Ahmed Alsoudani - Why I Paint". Vitamin P3, 20 December 2016. Retrieved 22 January 2021.
Suzannah Biernoff. Ahmed Alsoudani: the impurity of painting. London: Haunch of Venison, 2012. . Retrieved 29 January 2021.
Robert Hobbs. "Interview with Ahmed Alsoudani". In The World Belongs to You. Venice, Italy: Palazzo Grassi Centre of Contemporary Art/Foundation François Pinault, 2011. Retrieved 22 January 2021.
Ned Carter Miles (2017). "Ahmed Alsoudani at Marlborough Contemporary". ArtAsiaPacific Magazine. Retrieved 22 January 2021.
Johnny Misheff (1 June 2011). "Visiting Artists | Ahmed Alsoudani". T Magazine. Retrieved 22 January 2021.
Robert C. Morgan (November 2012). "Ahmed Alsoudani". The Brooklyn Rail. Retrieved 22 January 2021.
Charlotte Philby (23 October 2011). "Ahmed Alsoudani: Iraq to London, via New York and Venice". The Independent. Retrieved 22 January 2021.
Angela Zonunpari (19 November 2014). "Ahmed Alsoudani Explores Effects of War at Barbara Gladstone". Artnet News. Retrieved 22 January 2021.

External links 
 www.marlboroughnewyork.com/artists/ahmed-alsoudani

21st-century American painters
Artists from Baghdad
Iraqi expatriates in the United States
Iraqi painters
Maine College of Art alumni
Painters from New York City
Yale School of Art alumni
Living people
1975 births